The 2023 Judo Grand Slam Tel Aviv is a Judo Grand Slam tournament that was held at the Drive in Arena in Tel Aviv, Israel, from 16 to 18 February 2023 as part of the IJF World Tour and during the 2024 Summer Olympics qualification period.

Medal summary

Men's events

Women's events

Source results:

Medal table

Prize money
The sums written are per medalist, bringing the total prizes awarded to 154,000€.

References

External links
 

2023 Judo Grand Slam
2023 IJF World Tour
IJF World Tour Tel Aviv
Grand Slam 2023
Judo
Judo
Judo
Judo